Alice F. Schlapp was an American Democratic politician from Methuen, Massachusetts. She represented the 4th Essex district in the Massachusetts House of Representatives from 1943 to 1946.

See also
 1943-1944 Massachusetts legislature
 1945-1946 Massachusetts legislature

References

Year of birth missing
Year of death missing
Members of the Massachusetts House of Representatives
Women state legislators in Massachusetts
20th-century American women politicians
People from Methuen, Massachusetts
20th-century American politicians